Shorea flaviflora (called, along with some other species in the genus Shorea, dark red meranti) is a species of plant in the family Dipterocarpaceae. It is endemic to Borneo.

References

flaviflora
Endemic flora of Borneo
Trees of Borneo
Taxonomy articles created by Polbot